Ülle-Valve-Oktavie Ulla (10 November 1934 Tallinn – 9 April 2016 Tallinn) was an Estonian ballet dancer, opera and operetta singer, actress and dance pedagogue.

Career
In 1946, she enrolled at the  Estonian State Choreographical School, graduating in 1953.

From 1953 until 1966 and again from 1970 until 1973, she was a ballet soloist at Estonia Theatre. Ulla also performed in opera and operetta. After finishing her career as a ballet soloist, she performed in the Viru Variety Hall from 1972 until 1985. In the 1990s, she worked as a trainer and dance teacher at the Estonian Academy of Music and Theatre.

She has also played in several films.

In 1967, Ulla was the subject of the Leida Levald directed documentary film Ülle Ulla.

Personal life
Ulla was married three times. Her first marriage was to dancer Eduard-Anatoli Hanson. From 1960 until 1971, she was married to actor Ago-Endrik Kerge, with whom she had a daughter. From 1972 until 1991, she was married to conductor Eri Klas.

Acknowledgements
Meritorious Artist of the Estonian SSR (1965)

Filmography

 1962: Õhtust hommikuni (role: Karin)
 1985: Savoy ball (role: Bebe)
 1991: Vana mees tahab koju (role: Nurse Koidula)

References

1934 births
2016 deaths
Estonian ballet dancers
Estonian film actresses
Estonian stage actresses
20th-century Estonian actresses
20th-century Estonian women opera singers
Estonian musical theatre actresses
Academic staff of the Estonian Academy of Music and Theatre
Actresses from Tallinn